Naïma Azough (born 1 April 1972 in Asdif, Morocco) is a Dutch politician for GreenLeft. From 2002 till 2010 she had been member of the House of Representatives, with a short break between 2003 and 2004 and a break because of maternity leave in 2009.

Azough studied English and German at the University of Antwerp and International Relations at the University of Amsterdam. During her studies in Antwerp she was involved in committees against the Vlaams Blok. She worked as journalist for the IKON and at the debate centre De Balie. Between 1999 and 2001 she worked for Rotterdam 2001, the organization which organized the activities surrounding Rotterdam's election as Cultural Capital of Europe in 2001.

In the 2002 elections she was elected to the House of Representatives. During the 2003 elections she was unable to keep her seat. Between 2003 and 2004 she returned to journalism, now presenting the VPRO's cultural magazine Kunst Moet Zwemmen ("Art has to swim") and NMO's debating program De Dialoog ("The Dialogue"). In 2004, when Arie van den Brand's departure left a vacancy, she returned to parliament. Prior to the parliamentary elections of 2010, Azough was the parliamentary party's specialist on migration, home affairs and welfare. In 2010, she left public office.

External links
 Biografie on TweedeKamer.nl (archived version on the Wayback Machine)

1972 births
Living people
GroenLinks politicians
Members of the House of Representatives (Netherlands)
Moroccan emigrants to the Netherlands
Politicians from Amsterdam
21st-century Dutch politicians
21st-century Dutch women politicians